Patric Klandt (born 29 September 1983) is a German professional football coach and a former goalkeeper. He works as the goalkeeping coach with the Under-19 squad of Eintracht Frankfurt.

Coaching career
Klandt retired from playing in the summer of 2022 and was hired by Eintracht Frankfurt as goalkeepers' coach for their Under-19 squad.

References

External links
 

1983 births
Living people
German footballers
Association football goalkeepers
SV Wehen Wiesbaden players
FC Hansa Rostock players
Eintracht Frankfurt II players
FSV Frankfurt players
SC Freiburg players
SC Freiburg II players
1. FC Nürnberg players
1. FC Nürnberg II players
2. Bundesliga players
Footballers from Frankfurt